The Canton of Nesle is a former canton situated in the department of the Somme and in the Picardie region of northern France. It was disbanded following the French canton reorganisation which came into effect in March 2015. It consisted of 21 communes, which joined the canton of Ham in 2015. It had 8,076 inhabitants (2012).

Geography 
The canton is organised around the commune of Nesle in the arrondissement of Péronne. The altitude varies from 47m (Saint-Christ-Briost) to 104m (Licourt)  for an average of 71m.

The canton comprised 21 communes:

Béthencourt-sur-Somme
Buverchy
Cizancourt
Épénancourt
Falvy
Grécourt
Hombleux
Languevoisin-Quiquery
Licourt
Marchélepot
Mesnil-Saint-Nicaise
Misery
Morchain
Nesle
Pargny
Pertain
Potte
Rouy-le-Grand
Rouy-le-Petit
Saint-Christ-Briost
Voyennes

Population

See also
 Arrondissements of the Somme department
 Cantons of the Somme department
 Communes of the Somme department

References

Nesle
2015 disestablishments in France
States and territories disestablished in 2015